Yūya, Yuya or Yuuya is a masculine Japanese given name.

Possible writings
Yūya can be written using different combinations of kanji characters. Here are some examples: 

勇也, "courage, to be"
悠也, "calm, to be"
雄也, "male, to be"
優也, "gentleness, to be"
祐也, "to help, to be"
佑也, "to help, to be"
勇矢, "courage, arrow"
悠矢, "calm, arrow"
雄矢, "male, arrow"
裕矢, "rich, arrow"
優矢, "gentleness, arrow"
祐矢, "to help, arrow"
佑矢, "to help, arrow"
勇哉, "courage, how (interrogative particle)"
悠哉, "calm, how (interrogative particle)"
雄哉, "male, how (interrogative particle)"
優哉, "gentleness, how (interrogative particle)"
祐哉, "to help, how (interrogative particle)"
佑哉, "to help, how (interrogative particle)"
勇弥, "courage, more and more"
悠弥, "calm, more and more"
雄弥, "male, more and more"
優弥, "gentleness, more and more"
夕夜, "evening, night"

The name can also be written in hiragana ゆうや or katakana ユウヤ.

Notable people with the name
, Japanese baseball player
, Japanese manga artist
, Japanese footballer
, Japanese baseball player
, Japanese footballer
, Japanese footballer
, Japanese footballer
, Japanese footballer
, Japanese voice actor
, Japanese swimmer
, Japanese baseball player
, Japanese film director
, Japanese footballer
, Japanese footballer
, Japanese baseball player
, Japanese singer
, Japanese singer and actor
, Japanese shogi player
, Japanese footballer
, Japanese footballer
, Japanese footballer
, Japanese politician
, Japanese rugby union player
, Japanese speed skater
, Japanese footballer
, Japanese footballer
, Japanese table tennis player
, Japanese rugby union player
, Japanese footballer
, Japanese footballer
, Japanese writer
, Japanese mixed martial artist
, Japanese idol, singer and actor
, Japanese idol, actor and singer
, Japanese sumo wrestler
, Japanese singer and actor
, Japanese actor and voice actor
Yuya Watanabe (渡辺 雄也, born 1988), Japanese Magic: The Gathering player
, Japanese actor
, Japanese footballer
, Japanese kickboxer
, Japanese judoka
, Japanese footballer

Fictional characters
, a character in the anime series HappinessCharge PreCure!
, a character in the manga series Miracle Girls
, a character in the manga series Killing Bites
, protagonist of the anime series Yu-Gi-Oh! Arc-V
, a character in the manga series Samurai Deeper Kyo
Yuya Kizami (刻命 裕也), a character in the video game series Corpse Party
Yuya Sakazaki (坂咲 優夜), a character in the visual novel Hatoful Boyfriend

Japanese masculine given names